The River House is an historic building in the Skippool area of Thornton-Cleveleys, Lancashire, England. Overlooking the River Wyre, it was built in 1830, originally known as Wyre Bank, later becoming Wyre Bank Hotel and Restaurant. After two further renamings, firstly to The River House, then The River House Restaurant, in 1958, it was frequented by the likes of Rudolf Nureyev, George Harrison and prominent politicians and was run by members of the Scott family. It has also been a four-guestroom hotel.

Bill and Linda Scott ran the hotel for over thirty years, before selling it in 2005.

British Prime Ministers Edward Heath, Margaret Thatcher and Tony Blairstayed at the property during the Tory Party Conferences that were held in Blackpool. John Prescott has also stayed at The River House.

Today it is a private residence, with an addition on the northern side of the property.

Gallery

References

External links
An old sign from the building's days as a restaurant

Buildings and structures in the Borough of Wyre
The Fylde
Victorian architecture in England
Houses completed in 1830